Sunandini is a composite breed of cattle developed in India by crossing nondescript cattle with Brown Swiss, Jersey cattle and Holstein Friesian cattle.   Jersey and HF bulls from many parts of the world are extensively utilized to generate this breed.

References

Cattle breeds originating in Switzerland
Dairy cattle breeds